Edward Hospital & Health Services (Edward Hospital Services Corporation), commonly referred to as "Edwards", is a major healthcare provider located in southwest suburban Naperville, DuPage County, Illinois. The current President & Chief Executive Officer is Bill Kottmann, active since January 2017 replacing long-time President & CEO Pamela Meyer Davis who began her position in 1988.

Edward Hospital serves the residents of Chicago's west and southwest suburbs, including Naperville, Aurora, Bolingbrook, Channahon, Crest Hill, Downers Grove, Glen Ellyn, Homer Glen, Joliet, Lemont, Lisle, Lockport, Minooka, Montgomery, North Aurora, Oswego, Plainfield, Romeoville, Shorewood, Sugar Grove, Warrenville, Wheaton, Winfield, Woodridge, and Yorkville.

The main campus is located at 801 S. Washington Street, Naperville, IL.

History

Edward Sanitorium
Founded by Eudora Hull Gaylord Spalding in 1907, as a memorial to her husband Edward Gaylord, the Edward Sanitorium was one of the first treatment centers for tuberculosis in the Great Lakes region and became a model for other such centers in the nation.

In 1920, a fire destroyed the Sanitorium's main building. A new, fireproof structure was built at the cost of $150,000. The Sanitorium flourished in the 1930s, thanks in part to the support of Joy Morton, the owner of the Morton Salt Company and the founder of The Morton Arboretum in Lisle, Illinois.

As the tuberculosis epidemic subsided, Edward turned its attention to other more urgent community health needs.

Edward Hospital, 1955–1987
On October 1, 1955, Edward Sanitorium officially reopened its doors as Edward Hospital, an acute-care facility with 45 beds. The hospital's first patient was 23-month-old Frederich Maurer, Jr., who was brought in after he was kicked by a horse.

Edward became a public, tax-supported entity in 1959. As the Naperville, Illinois community grew, Edward expanded, adding patient care units and providing patients with more advanced technology. In 1962, the hospital expanded to 110 beds with state-of-the-art all-electric beds, a nurse call communication system and piped-in oxygen. Just five years later, in 1967, Edward grew to 133 beds with a $620,000 addition to the main building.

By 1981, Edward had 162 patient beds and 125 physicians. Eugene Morris, president of the hospital since 1959, retired. In the following years, Edward turned down merger, acquisition and management offers from competing Chicago area hospitals and remained independent. In 1984, Edward became a private, non-profit organization.

Edward Hospital, 1988–2012
In 1988, the arrival of Pamela Meyer (now Pam Davis) as president and chief executive officer marked the beginning of an era of dramatic and continuous growth and innovation at Edward Hospital. Since then, Edward Hospital evolved into the Edward Health Services Corporation in the 1990s and, now, Edward Hospital & Health Services.

The first major move under Davis was the opening of Edward Health & Fitness Center on the Naperville campus, the first medically based fitness center in DuPage County, Illinois. (A second Edward Health & Fitness Center, in Woodridge, opened in 1997.)

In 1990, Edward introduced a comprehensive cardiac medicine program, offering open heart surgery, diagnostic services and cardiac rehabilitation. The state's first freestanding outpatient heart center, the Edward Cardiovascular Institute, opened in 1993 and in 1998, Edward became the first healthcare facility in DuPage County to screen people for heart disease using Electron Beam CT calcium scoring (Ultra Fast Heart Scan).

The 1990s also saw the opening of the Edward Cancer Center, expansion of the emergency department, opening of Edward Healthcare Centers in Bolingbrook, Illinois and Naperville, the acquisition of Linden Oaks Hospital (a full-service behavioral health facility) and the opening of the Center for Surgery in Naperville.

In addition, in 1992, Edward became the first hospital in Illinois to offer all private patient rooms, one of many innovations in patient care and customer service for which Edward has become known. Others include animal assisted therapy, healing arts, concierge service and valet parking.

Modern Healthcare magazine recognized the spectacular growth in 1998 by naming Edward as the 34th fastest-growing hospital in the U.S. and fastest-growing in Illinois.  In 1999, Edward reaffirmed those rankings with a "Growth Zone" announcement for its  Naperville campus-a $90 million renovation and expansion project to ensure high quality healthcare for a fast-growing community. Over the next couple of years, the project resulted in expanded outpatient services, expanded women's imaging services, new operating rooms for minimally invasive procedures, new mother/baby suites, and a four-floor Education Center and a 900-space parking garage.

Since 2000, the pace and scope of expansion has increased. Edward opened the first pediatric emergency department in DuPage County, and also achieved a Level III designation for its neonatal intensive care unit, the highest level of care in Illinois in 2000.  Additionally, in 2004, it expanded its emergency department by another  to allow for annual growth in the number of emergency visits and more private and efficient triage and treatment areas for patients.

In 2002, the 71-bed Edward Heart Hospital opened (the first of its kind in Illinois) and reinforced Edward as a national leader in complex cardiac care. That reputation was further enhanced in 2005 when HealthGrades ranked Edward #1 for cardiac surgery in the Chicago area and again in 2006 when Edward was named a Solucient Top 100 Hospital for cardiovascular care.

In 2005 the Edward Cancer Center opened. The  facility doubled the previous space available for medical oncology and radiation therapy.

Also in 2005, Edward became the only hospital serving DuPage and Will Counties to achieve the Magnet designation for nursing excellence. At the time, only two percent of the nation's 6,000 hospitals had been recognized with the honor by the American Nurses Credentialing Center.

2006 saw Edward expand access to convenient, high quality healthcare in Plainfield with the opening of the Edward Plainfield Outpatient Center, a  facility that provides Immediate Care, imaging services and community Wellness classes and events to the residents of one of the fastest-growing areas in Illinois. Edward Sleep Center and Edward administrative offices opened on Diehl Road in Warrenville as well.

The Edward Plainfield Outpatient Center is located on the  Edward Plainfield campus, which is also the site of a Medical Office Building (opened in 2006) and the future home to Edward Plainfield Hospital (seeking approval to build), Plainfield Surgery Center (2008) and Edward Plainfield Cancer Center (2009).

Linden Oaks at Edward began 2007 with the opening of Arabella House, an eight-bed residential care home for women with eating disorders. The home helps patients ease back into the "real world," from care in a hospital setting back to family, home, work, school.  Also in 2007, Edward announced plans for a nearly $200 million "makeover" on its Naperville campus that will result in upgraded OB services, renovated and expanded surgical services, new cardiac cath capacity and a build-out of a new three-floor addition to Edward Heart Hospital. Edward closed 2007 by completing a $49.7 million, three-floor, 42-bed addition to the Edward Heart Hospital building. The expansion includes 28 beds for medical/surgical patients and 14 beds for intensive care unit patients.

Edward was ranked as the 10th largest hospital in the Chicago area by Crain's Chicago Business in 2007, is the largest employer in Naperville, and is the busiest hospital in DuPage County for inpatient discharges, births and emergency visits, according to the Metropolitan Chicago Healthcare Council.

In 2008, Edward's growth in the southwest suburbs continued with the openings of the Plainfield Surgery Center on the Edward Plainfield campus and Edward Healthcare Center in Oswego. On the Naperville campus, Edward addressed the increased demand for services with the completion of a two-floor, 360-space addition to the South Parking Deck.

Edward Cancer Center kicked off RapidArc, radiation therapy technology that treats patients up to eight times faster than conventional or helical IMRT delivery systems.

Today, Edward Hospital & Health Services is a full-service, regional healthcare provider. , Edward Hospital has 354 private patient rooms and 7,700 employees, including 1,340 nurses and a medical staff of more than 1,900 physicians, representing nearly 100 medical and surgical specialties and subspecialties. Ninety-eight percent of Edward's physicians are board certified.

Edward also provides imaging technology, care for critically ill newborns, minimally invasive surgery, newest clinical trials and behavioral health services through Linden Oaks at Edward.

Merger with Elmhurst Memorial Hospital and NorthShore University Health System, 2013 - today 
In July 2013, Edward Hospital merged with Elmhurst Memorial Hospital to create a new healthcare system currently called Edward-Elmhurst Health.

In 2018, Edward-Elmhurst Health announced that it had overestimated its revenues by $92 million over several years.  After revealing the error, CEO Mary Lou Mastro stated that the hospital system had made corrections to its accounting systems.

Edward Hospital was ranked the #8 hospital in Illinois and in the Chicago region by U.S. News & World Report in their 2021 Best Hospitals rankings.

In January 2022, Edward-Elmhurst and NorthShore University HealthSystem completed their merger, creating the third-largest health system in Illinois, with 9 hospitals.

Locations
 Edward Healthcare Center, Bolingbrook
 Edward-Elmhurst Health Center, Lombard
 Edward Medical Group, Bolingbrook
 Edward Medical Group, Crest Hill
 Edward Medical Group, Lisle
 Naperville Campus
 Edward Hospital
 Heart Hospital
 Edward Health & Fitness Center
 Cancer Center
 Diabetes Center
 Edward Medical Group
 Linden Oaks Hospital at Edward
 Naperville Off-Campus
 Linden Oaks 
 Edward Healthcare Center 
 Edward Medical Group, 95th St. 
 Edward Medical Group, Hobson Road
 Woman's Imaging Center
 The Center for Surgery
 Edward Healthcare Center, Oswego
 Edward Medical Group, Oswego

 Plainfield Campus
 Plainfield Outpatient Center
 Plainfield Surgery Center
 Edward Medical Group
 Plainfield Off-Campus
 Edward Healthcare Center
 Edward Medical Group
 Edward Medical Group, Sandwich
 Edward Sleep Center, Warrenville
 Edward Health & Fitness Center (Seven Bridges)
 Edward Healthcare Center, Yorkville
 Edward Medical Group, Yorkville, IL 60560)

References

External links
 

Hospitals established in 1907
Hospitals in Illinois
Buildings and structures in DuPage County, Illinois
Buildings and structures in Naperville, Illinois
Bolingbrook, Illinois
Plainfield, Illinois
Tuberculosis sanatoria in the United States
1907 establishments in Illinois